Ivica Šangulin (20 April 1937 – 5 May 2012) was a Croatian football player and manager.

Career
Born in Biograd na Moru, he spent his early years with Šibenik, before moving on to Dinamo Zagreb for one season. He left a big mark with HNK Rijeka, where he played for four years. He then moved to West Germany where he played for Hertha BSC for three seasons, before moving to lower division teams towards the end of his career. As a manager, he was in charge of many Croatian clubs.

Honours

As a player
Hertha Berlin
Regionalliga Berlin: 1966-67, 1967-68

Tasmania Berlin
Regionalliga Berlin: 1970-71

As a coach
NK Rijeka
Yugoslav Second League: 1973-74

NK Orijent
Druga HNL runner-up: 1993-94

References

External links
 

1937 births
2012 deaths
People from Zadar County
Association football defenders
Yugoslav footballers
HNK Šibenik players
GNK Dinamo Zagreb players
HNK Rijeka players
Hertha BSC players
SC Tasmania 1900 Berlin players
Yugoslav First League players
Bundesliga players
Yugoslav expatriate footballers
Expatriate footballers in West Germany
Yugoslav expatriate sportspeople in West Germany
Yugoslav football managers
HNK Rijeka managers
NK Zadar managers
HNK Šibenik managers
Croatian football managers
HNK Orijent managers